The Amboina box turtle or Southeast Asian box turtle (Cuora amboinensis) is a species of Asian box turtle.

It is found in the Nicobar Islands, eastern India (Assam), Bangladesh, Myanmar, Thailand, Cambodia, Laos, central and southern Vietnam, west Malaysia, Singapore, Philippines (Leyte, Luzon, Mindanao, Samar, Negros, Panay, etc.), Indonesia (Sulawesi, Ambon Island, Sumatra, Borneo, East Malaysia, Brunei, Nias, Enggano, Simeulue, Java, Sumbawa, Halmahera, Ceram, Seram, Buru, East Timor, Bali, Palawan and Maluku), and possibly China (Guangxi and Guangdong) and Sri Lanka.

The type locality is "Amboine" (or "Amboina") Island, today Ambon Island in Indonesia.

Description
These turtles have blackish-brown to olive-brown colored shells that are not as ornate as many other box turtles.  All have a blackish olive head with three yellow stripes on the side. The male can be identified by the slightly concave shape to its plastron.  There is no specific pattern to what the underbellies may look like, for either sex. The only true way of telling age is to guess by the texture of the shell, as growth rings form irregularly.

There are four subspecies that are primarily differentiated by differences in the color and shape of the carapace:

 Cuora amboinensis amboinensis (Wallacean box turtle) – eastern Indonesian islands: Ambon Island, Sulawesi, the Moluccas, Buru, Seram, and East Timor and smaller islands in the region.
Has a quite flat shell with flared marginal scutes. The plastron has bigger black spots, and it possesses a bigger head; well adapted for an aquatic lifestyle. For individuals suspected to be of this subspecies: Ratio of carapace length / height:  3.08. Average ratio dimensions of plastron spots: 1.21 (almost circular)
 Cuora amboinensis couro (West Indonesian box turtle) (Schweigger, 1812) – south Indonesian islands: Sumatra, Java, Bali and Sumbawa.
Moderately domed carapace, some individuals possess flared marginal scutes.  The plastron shows black markings on every plastral scute. Darker in coloration, more oval black spots on the plastron.
 Cuora amboinensis kamaroma (Malayan box turtle or domed Malayan box turtle) Rummler & Fritz, 1991 Mainland Indochina (South and Central Vietnam, southern Laos and Cambodia), Thailand (Phang Nga Province etc.), Singapore and mainland Malaysia and Borneo.
High domed carapace and smaller, more elongated plastron with less black spots than the other subspecies. It has a smaller and shorter tail compared to the other subspecies and does not have any flares in the marginal scutes. Average ratio of carapace length / height: 2.82. Average ratio dimensions of plastron spots: 2.14 (small and elongated)
 Cuora amboinensis lineata (Burmese box turtle) McCord & Philippen, 1998 – Myanmar.
Resembles Cuora amboinensis kamaroma, but in the carapace there is a bright colored mid-dorsal line, and sometimes a bright colored lateral line. The plastral scutes possess large black spots similar to Cuora amboinensis couro.

Several distinct populations are believed to represent up to four more subspecies, or at least striking varieties.
 the Nicobar Islands
 eastern India (Assam), Bangladesh, and possibly Sri Lanka
 Borneo, the Malaysian islands, Brunei, and Palawan
 the Philippines (Leyte, Luzon, Mindanao, Samar, Negros, Panay, etc.)

C. a. kamaroma has hybridized in captivity with the Vietnamese pond turtle – a species nearly extinct in the wild – and with males of the Chinese pond turtle (Chinemys reevesii). Other hybrids are known, like C. amboinensis × Cuora trifasciata.

Ecology and status
They are omnivorous, with younger turtles tending towards more meat consumption and older turtles eating a more herbivorous diet.

Although Cuora amboinensis is classified as endangered by the IUCN, they are able to thrive in some areas of the world. For example, they can be found in the storm drains of Brunei. These are seriously polluted, and yet seem to be extremely popular habitat for these turtles and other animals that can withstand eutrophication. In some places, this species is hunted for use in folk medicine.

Cuora amboinensis can be quite difficult to breed in captivity, compared with other box turtles. These turtles have a mating ritual very similar to that of other box turtles. No courtship occurs, the male simply climbs upon the female. He then snaps at her head, so that she closes the front half of her shell, opening the back.

Cuora amboinensis is one of the most heavily traded species in Southeast Asia, captured from the wild in huge numbers to supply demand for pets, meat and for use in traditional medicines. Indonesia is the greatest source of this species and while there are quotas in place, these quotas are regularly exceeded.

Pet care

Any individual considering a turtle as a pet should thoroughly research both general care and the care of the particular species in which they are interested.  Individuals considering a Cuora amboinensis as a pet should keep in mind that it is a tropical, non-hibernating species who needs much warmer water (about 82 °F) than many other semi-aquatic species.  The adult Cuora amboinensis is smaller in comparison to more well-known species such as the red-eared slider or cooter, but a fully grown adult will generally need at least a 55-gallon tank and this habitat should be semi-aquatic, not terrestrial.

Cuora amboinensis is far more aquatic than many other box turtle species. Unfortunately, this has often led to pet Cuoras being incorrectly housed in terrestrial habitats.  Although they are clumsy swimmers and need shallower water than other semi-aquatic turtles that are stronger swimmers, (e.g., sliders, cooters, and painteds), they tend to vastly prefer being in the water to on land.  In the wild, they will often live in almost entirely in water only emerging to bask and to lay eggs. They can even mate in the water.

References

 
  (2008): Reptiles used in traditional folk medicine: conservation implications. Biodiversity and Conservation 17 (8): 2037–2049.  (HTML abstract, PDF first page)
  (1997): Cuora amboinensis la tortuga caja del sudeste asiático y sus subespecies ["C. amboinensis, the southeast Asian box turtle, and its subspecies"]. Reptilia 13: 43–47 [Article in Spanish].
  (2002): Ein Gattungsbastard zweier südostasiatischer Schildkröten: Cuora amboinensis kamaroma Rummler & Fritz 1991 × Mauremys annamensis (Siebenrock 1903) ["An intergeneric hybrid of two Southeast Asian turtles: C. a. kamaroma × M. annamensis"]. Salamandra 38 (3): 129–134 [Article in German].
  (2002): Captive bred hybrids between Chinemys reevesii (Gray, 1831) and Cuora amboinensis kamaroma Rummler & Fritz, 1991. Herpetozoa 15 (3/4): 137–148.
 
  (1991): Geographische Variabilität der Amboina-Scharnierschildkröte Cuora amboinensis (Daudin, 1802), mit Beschreibung einer neuen Unterart, C. a. kamaroma subsp. nov. ["Geographic variation of C. amboinensis with description of a new subspecies, C. a. kamaroma"]. Salamandra 27 (1/2): 17–45 [Article in German].
 
 
  (2006): Turtles of the World (Vol. 4: East and South Asia) – Schildkröten der Welt (Band 4: Ost- und Südasien). Edition Chimaira, Frankfurt am Main.

Further reading

Cuora amboinensis kamaroma, Rui Pessoa, May 2007, Lisbon, Portugal

  (1999): Ergänzende Bemerkungen zur Haltung und zur Nachzucht von Cuora flavomarginata (Gray 1863) ["Additional remarks on captive care and breeding of C. flavomarginata"]. Elaphe 7 (3): 2–10 [Article in German].
  (1988): Cuora mccordi, a new Chinese box turtle from Guangxi Province. Proc. Biol. Soc. Washington 101: 466–470.
  (1980): Die Schildkrötengattung Cuora ["The turtle genus Curoa"]. Herpetofauna 2 (6): 15–18 [Article in German].
  (1985): Langjährige Erfahrungen bei der Pflege von Cuora amboinensis (Daudin) ["Long-term experiences in captive care of C. amboinensis"]. Herpetofauna 7 (36): 6–14 [Article in German].

External links

 
 

Cuora
Turtles of Asia
Reptiles of India
Reptiles of the Philippines
Reptiles of Thailand
Reptiles of Indonesia
Reptiles described in 1802